Blue Creek is an unincorporated community in western Jefferson Township, Adams County, Ohio, United States.  It is located along State Route 125. It has a post office with the ZIP code 45616.

History
A post office was established at Blue Creek 1844; it closed in 1907, and reopened in 1933. The community took its name from nearby Blue Creek.

Notable people
Cowboy Copas, country music singer
Wiley Piatt, baseball player

Gallery

References

Unincorporated communities in Ohio
Unincorporated communities in Adams County, Ohio
1844 establishments in Ohio
Populated places established in 1844